Nick Peterson (born February 23, 1973) is an American rower. He competed in the men's quadruple sculls event at the 2000 Summer Olympics.  He graduated from Harvard University.

References

External links
 

1973 births
Living people
American male rowers
Olympic rowers of the United States
Rowers at the 2000 Summer Olympics
Sportspeople from Alexandria, Virginia
Harvard Crimson rowers